Diamond Sports Group LLC is an American media and entertainment company operating as a subsidiary of Sinclair Broadcast Group, and partnered with Entertainment Studios. The company operates Bally Sports, a group of regional sports channels that was formerly known as the Fox Sports Networks.

History
Sinclair Broadcast Group formed the company with Byron Allen's Entertainment Studios to acquire 22 regional Fox Sports Networks affiliates and Fox College Sports from The Walt Disney Company, which was required to divest of these networks to secure government antitrust approval. The transaction, initially valued at $10.6 billion, is managed through a joint venture called Diamond Holdings Group, and formally closed the transfer in August 2019 for $9.6 billion.

The company's regional sports networks have exclusive broadcasting rights to 42 professional teams (including 16 National Basketball Association teams, 14 Major League Baseball teams, and 12 National Hockey League teams), and the channels collectively generated $3.8 billion in 2018, across nearly 75 million subscribers.

Sinclair took a $4.23 billion write-down of its regional sports assets in 2020 after a downturn in the business.

On November 18, 2020, Sinclair announced that it had entered into an agreement with casino operator Bally's Corporation to acquire the naming rights under a 10-year deal.

On January 27, 2021, Sinclair announced that the networks would be rebranded as Bally Sports on March 31. In December 2021, the company reached an extension agreement with the National Hockey League.

On May 2, 2022, Diamond Sports Group assembled a board of five directors, made up of Bob Whitsitt, Sinclair CEO Chris Ripley, Randy Freer, a former Fox Sports/Hulu executive, Mary Ann Turcke, a former COO of the NFL, and David Preschlack (previously President of the NBC Sports Regional Networks); Preschlack would be elected CEO of Diamond on December 5.

On June 23, 2022, Bally Sports soft-launched a direct-to-consumer service known as Bally Sports Plus (or Bally Sports+) in selected markets. It is expected to launch nationally in the remainder of the networks' footprint on September 26.

On December 4, 2022, Diamond Sports Group's board had voted to block the Sinclair Broadcast Group from operating Diamond and its regional sports networks.

On February 15, 2023, Diamond Sports Group failed to make a $140M interest payment, instead opting for a 30-day grace period to make the payment. During this grace period, Diamond Sports also missed a rights payment to the Arizona Diamondbacks. On March 14, 2023, Diamond Sports officially filed for Chapter 11 Bankruptcy. Diamond Sports said in a statement they intended to operate the Bally Sports regional sports networks as normal through the bankruptcy process. As part of their restructuring under bankruptcy, Diamond Sports will separate from the Sinclair Broadcast Group and become a standalone company.

An email from Diamond CEO David Preschlack announced on March 20, 2023 that Steve Rosenberg would no longer be the president of Diamond Sports Group; Rosenberg's last day as president of Diamond was March 19. With his departure, Diamond's chief financial officer David DeVoe will take on additional COO responsibilities.

References

Mass media companies of the United States
Television broadcasting companies of the United States
American companies established in 2019
Mass media companies established in 2019
American corporate subsidiaries
Bally Sports
Companies that filed for Chapter 11 bankruptcy in 2023
Fox Sports Networks
Joint ventures
Entertainment Studios
Sinclair Broadcast Group